Darreh Duzdan (also Romanized as Darreh Dūzdān; also known as Darreh Dūzān) is a village in Dehpir-e Shomali Rural District, in the Central District of Khorramabad County, Lorestan Province, Iran. At the 2006 census, its population was 225, in 52 families.

References 

Towns and villages in Khorramabad County